Racheal Ntono (born 7 July 1997) is a Ugandan cricketer. Ntono started playing cricket in 2011, when she was still in school.

In July 2018, she was named in Uganda's squad for the 2018 ICC Women's World Twenty20 Qualifier tournament. She made her Women's Twenty20 International (WT20I) for Uganda against Scotland in the World Twenty20 Qualifier on 7 July 2018. In April 2019, she was named in Uganda's squad for the 2019 ICC Women's Qualifier Africa tournament in Zimbabwe.

References

External links
 

1997 births
Living people
Ugandan women cricketers
Uganda women Twenty20 International cricketers
Place of birth missing (living people)